Helichrysum aciculare is a species of flowering plant in the family Asteraceae.
It is found only in Yemen.
Its natural habitat is rocky areas.

References

aciculare
Endemic flora of Socotra
Least concern plants
Taxonomy articles created by Polbot